Rafiou Moutairou is a retired Togolese football player. He finished in 3rd place in the 1983 African Footballer of the Year polling while playing for OC Agaza in Lomé. Rafiou Moutairo is the half brother from Bachirou Salou.

Moutairou played for the Togo national football team at the 1984 African Cup of Nations.

References

External links

1960 births
Living people
Togolese footballers
Togo international footballers
OC Agaza players
1984 African Cup of Nations players
Association football forwards
21st-century Togolese people